The women's heptathlon at the 2015 World Championships in Athletics was held at the Beijing National Stadium on 22 and 23 August.

Summary
Hanna Kasyanova (née Melnychenko) of Ukraine entered the competition as defending champion, although the favourite for the competition was the silver medalist of 2013 World Championships Brianne Theisen-Eaton who is the world leader by a margin of more than 250 points. Other potential winners and medalists were 2009 World and 2012 Olympic champion Jessica Ennis-Hill, returning from giving birth to her first child, 2015 European pentathlon champion and 2014 world number one Katarina Johnson-Thompson, Nadine Broersen, Carolin Schäfer, Barbara Nwaba, Nadine Visser and Nafissatou Thiam.

The returning champion Kasyanova did not start.  The American champion Nwaba fell out of contention from the gun of the first race, misstepping the first hurdle and falling at the next.  Meanwhile, Olympic champion Ennis-Hill made it clear she was intending to take this championship.  Visser started strongly with two personal bests, her 12.81 hurdles just missing the national record that is almost 6 years older than she is.  Johnson-Thompson joined her hyphenated British teammate in the medal hunt with a 1.89 high jump and a 200 metres win and personal bests in the other two events.  Lurking in fourth place after the first day was returning silver medalist and world leader Theisen-Eaton who had been struggling through her last couple of events.

As the second day began, Theisen-Eaton excelled in the long jump while Johnson-Thompson was unable to land a legal jump, taking her out of the hunt and reshuffling the top athletes.  Also joining the medal hunt was the top long jumper of the day, Claudia Rath.  Anastasiya Mokhnyuk moved into the third-place position while Ennis-Hill's lead was over a hundred points.  The javelin throw is not a strong event for any of the jumpers allowing strong throwers Laura Ikauniece-Admidiņa and the other Dutch Nadine Broersen to move up into the top four.   Theisen-Eaton injured her groin during the javelin but made it to the start line of the final event intending to run for a medal.   Theisen-Eaton ran hard at the front of the final group, chased only by Ennis-Hill, the pair clearly outdistancing the rest of the leader group.  But Ennis-Hill was not just satisfied by winning on points, she stamped an exclamation point on the win by marking Theisen-Eaton to the final straight then sprinting past.  Ikauniece-Admidiņa held on to third place with her Latvian National Record while Boersen and Mokhnyuk suffered several seconds further back.

Records
Prior to the competition, the records were as follows:

Qualification standards

Schedule

Results

100 metres hurdles
The 100 metres hurdles was held on 22 August at 09:00.

High jump
The high jump was started on 22 August at 10:20.

Shot put
The shot put was held on 22 August at 18:30.

200 metres
The 200 metres were held on 22 August at 20:15.

Wind:Heat 1: +0.4, Heat 2: −1.3, Heat 3: +0.8, Heat 4: +0.2 m/s.

Long jump
The long jump was started on 23 August at 09:00.

Javelin throw
The javelin throw was started on 23 August at 10:50.

800 metres
The 800 metres were held on 23 August at 19:40.

Final standings
After all events.

References

Heptathlon
Heptathlon at the World Athletics Championships
2015 in women's athletics